The Federation of (Ophthalmic and Dispensing) Opticians is a trade organisation representing eye care providers and registered opticians in business in the UK and Republic of Ireland.  It was founded in 1985.

In the UK, they are founder members of the Optical Confederation and supporters of Vision 2020 UK and the UK Vision Strategy.

References

Eye care in the United Kingdom
Medical and health organisations based in the Republic of Ireland
Medical associations based in the United Kingdom
Organisations based in the City of Westminster